Anthony Tremaine Hills (born November 4, 1984) is a former American football offensive tackle. He was drafted by the Pittsburgh Steelers in the fourth round of the 2008 NFL Draft. He won Super Bowl XLIII with Pittsburgh over the Arizona Cardinals. He played college football at University of Texas.

Early years
Though born in Dallas, Hills grew up in Houston, where he was an All-State tight end at Alief Elsik High School. During Hills' senior year, he was rated by some scouting services as the top tight end prospect in the country, and he committed to play college football at Texas.  His team reached the 5A state semifinals, but lost 30-21 to Converse Judson.  During that game, Hills suffered a severe injury to his peroneal nerve and was told that he might not be able to play football again.  He underwent two surgeries and lengthy rehabilitation before reporting to Texas (which was honoring his scholarship despite the injury) in spring 2004.

College career
Hills attended the University of Texas, where he was forced to redshirt the 2003 season after reconstructive surgery on his left knee following a career-threatening injury (nerve damage). When he returned, he was moved from tight end to offensive tackle, and appeared in 31 games during his first three seasons (2004–2006). In 2005, he was part of the Longhorn team that won the National Championship. As a junior in 2006, Hills started at left tackle in all 13 games of the season. He started the Longhorns' first 11 games of 2007, but suffered a fractured left fibula that cost him the last two games.

Professional career

2008 NFL Draft
Hills is considered to be part of a strong group of offensive tackles and was seen by most analysts as a third-round pick.  He was selected by the Pittsburgh Steelers in the fourth round with the 130th pick.

Pittsburgh Steelers
Hills was drafted in the fourth round of the 2008 NFL Draft by the Pittsburgh Steelers, spending three seasons with the team. He played in 4 games during the 2010 season. He was released on September 3, 2011.

Denver Broncos
On September 6, 2011, he signed with the Denver Broncos.

Indianapolis Colts
On October 6, 2012, he signed with the Indianapolis Colts. He played in 6 games for the Colts during the 2012 season, starting 1.

Buffalo Bills
On July 28, 2013, Hills signed with the Buffalo Bills. On August 18, 2013, he was released by the Bills.

Oakland Raiders
On August 20, 2013, Hills was signed by the Oakland Raiders.

Miami Dolphins
On July 28, 2014, Hills was signed by the Miami Dolphins.

Dallas Cowboys
On October 15, 2014 Hills was signed by the Dallas Cowboys.  He played in 3 games for the Cowboys during the 2014 season.

Carolina Panthers
On July 28, 2015, Hills was signed by the Carolina Panthers. He was cut on August 30, 2015.

Baltimore Ravens
On September 16, 2015, the Baltimore Ravens signed Hills to their practice squad. On September 21, 2015, he was waived by the Ravens.

New Orleans Saints
On October 6, 2015, Hills signed with the New Orleans Saints, his tenth team of his NFL career. Expected to be only a backup  in his first game after signing, a nationally televised Thursday Night Football game against Atlanta, he ended up playing left tackle for most of the game after an injury to Saints rookie Andrus Peat.  Hills ultimately played in 8 games for the Saints in 2015.  He started the 2016 off-season as a free agent, but returned to the Saints on August 1, 2016. On September 3, 2016, he was released by the Saints. He re-signed on September 21, 2016.

Detroit Lions
On June 8, 2017, Hills signed with the Detroit Lions.

On July 31, 2017, Hills announced his retirement from the NFL.

Personal life
Hills' younger brother Jeremy also attended Alief Elsik, and played running back at University of Texas.

References

External links
NFL Combine profile
Miami Dolphins bio

1984 births
Living people
Players of American football from Dallas
American football offensive tackles
Texas Longhorns football players
Pittsburgh Steelers players
Denver Broncos players
Indianapolis Colts players
Buffalo Bills players
Oakland Raiders players
Miami Dolphins players
Dallas Cowboys players
Carolina Panthers players
Baltimore Ravens players
New Orleans Saints players
Detroit Lions players